Cornelius "Con" Linton (9 January 1938 – 30 December 2016) was a New Zealand sailor. He represented his country in the Soling class at the 1972 Summer Olympics in Kiel, with Steve Marten as helmsman and Jack Scholes as fellow crew member, finishing in 21st place.

Born in Nelson in 1938, Linton was educated at Nelson College from 1951 to 1952. He died at his home in Auckland on 30 December 2016.

References

1939 births
2016 deaths
New Zealand male sailors (sport)
Sailors at the 1972 Summer Olympics – Soling
Olympic sailors of New Zealand
Sportspeople from Nelson, New Zealand
People educated at Nelson College